Sabanayevo (Habanay) is a rural locality (a village) in Staroyantuzovsky Selsoviet, Dyurtyulinsky District, Bashkortostan, Russia. The population was 155 as of 2010. There are 3 streets.

Geography 
Sabanayevo is located 27 km east of Dyurtyuli (the district's administrative centre) by road. Turbek is the nearest rural locality.

References 

Rural localities in Dyurtyulinsky District